Willow, also known as "Willow the cat", is a calico cat who travelled 1,800 miles from Westminster, Colorado, to New York City. Willow was discovered in September 2011, 5 years after escaping during a renovation, when her implanted microchip was scanned at an animal shelter. Anderson Cooper reunited Willow with her family, the Squireses, via satellite on September 15, 2011. Willow was reunited in person with the Squireses on the night of September 22, 2011, and made an appearance on The Today Show with Matt Lauer on September 23, 2011.

See also

Jack (cat)
List of individual cats

References

Female mammals
Individual cats in the United States